The 1997 3 Nations Cup was a women's ice hockey tournament held various locations of the Northeastern United States and Canada from December 13–20, 1997. It was the second edition of the 3 Nations Cup.

Results

Preliminary round

All times are local (UTC−5).

Gold medal game

Statistics

Final standings

Scoring leaders
Only the top eight skaters, sorted by points, then goals, are included in this list.

External links
Tournament recap
NWT 99 Women's World Media Guide

1997
1997–98 in American women's ice hockey
1997–98 in Canadian women's ice hockey
1997–98 in Finnish ice hockey
1997–98 in women's ice hockey
1997
1997
1997
1997
1997
1997
1997
1997
1997
December 1997 sports events in North America
1997 in sports in New York (state)
1997 in sports in Vermont
1997 in Ontario
Ice hockey competitions in New York (state)